IRIB Varzesh (Shibkâh-e Vârzesh) is a national sports TV channel in Iran which was launched on July 18, 2012 and is the fifth Iranian television channel to broadcast in digital mode and the second one to broadcast in High Definition quality. This channel is currently available using Set-top box devices and online.

This channel broadcasts some sports competitions held in Iran and the world. Broadcasting of channel programs in HD format and HEVC codec from terrestrial and satellite receivers began on 29 November 2020.

History 
After the implementation of the digital broadcasting system and the expansion of this system in Iran, the number of national channels increased. IRIB Varzesh was officially inaugurated on 18 July 2012 with the presence of Mahmoud Ahmadinejad, the then President of Iran.

IRIB Varzesh was placed on the third transmitter in the provinces on 31 July 2012.

The director of this channel is currently Sina Motazedi.

Broadcast range 
This channel is broadcast in most parts of Iran through digital transmitters on the Ultra high frequency band. The channel's programs are also broadcast via Badr 5 satellite in Asia, Europe and the Middle East. However, during the live broadcast of football, volleyball, basketball, handball, tennis and other sports matches, it is possible to watch it only through digital transmitters inside Iran, and due to non-observance of the right to broadcast matches, on satellite frequencies instead of live broadcasts of matches, Various sports, sports documentaries are broadcast. Receiving IRIB Varzesh programs is free. This channel is active 24 hours a day. The channel's programs are also broadcast for free through the Internet and the Telewebion website.

Programs

Varzesh televises two Persian Gulf Pro League matches per week and occasionally televises important Azadegan League matches. The channel also shows Olympic and World Cup documentaries and educational sports videos.

Varzesh also airs several popular Iranian Wrestling shows, including: 120 Football which focuses on European Football, Meydan which focuses on Iranian sports and Lezate Football which mainly televises European and International football matches.
Varzesh also other sports Volleyball tournament in the world and Iran.

Multi-sport event
Summer Olympic Games
Winter Olympic Games
Summer Paralympic Games
Winter Paralympic Games
Asian Games
Universiade
Islamic games
European games
Youth Olympic
world games 
IIHF World Championship

Football
FIFA World Cup
FIFA World Cup qualification
UEFA European Championship
UEFA European Championship qualifying
UEFA European Under-21 Championship
Copa América
AFC Asian Cup
AFC U-23 Championship
FIFA Club World Cup
UEFA Champions League
UEFA Europa League
UEFA Super Cup
AFC Champions League
Premier League
FA Cup
FA Community Shield
Liga BBVA
Copa del Rey
Supercopa de España
Bundesliga
DFB-Pokal
DFL-Supercup
Serie A
Supercoppa Italiana
Ligue 1
Trophée des Champions
Campeonato Brasileiro Série A
Iran Persian Gulf Pro League
Iran Azadegan League
Iran Hazfi Cup

kabaddi
Iran junior world championship
Kabaddi premier league

Volleyball
FIVB World League
FIVB World Championships
PlusLiga
CEV Champions League
Italian Volleyball League
Iranian Volleyball Super League
Asian beach volleyball
Avc cup (Asian volleyball championship)
Avc cup U20 , U18
Asian volleyball club
FIVB Club World Championship

Basketball
NBA
FIBA Basketball World Cup
FIBA Asia Cup
FIBA Asia Champions Cup
WABA Championship
Iranian Basketball Super League
Euro league
Euro basket

Handball
IHF World Men's Handball Championship
Asian Men's Handball Championship
EHF Champions League
Iran Handball Pro League
European handball championship 
Handball world club(global)

Futsal
FIFA Futsal World Cup
AFC Futsal Championship
AFC Futsal Club Championship
Iranian Futsal Super League
European futsal championship

Wrestling
Iranian Premier Wrestling League
World champion wrestling
World U23 wrestling 
world U20 wrestling
World U17 wrestling

Formula racing
Formula one

Motorcycle racing
MotoGP
Moto2
Moto3

Popular programs
 Football 120 (2013–)
 Shabhaye Footballi (2015–)
 Nowruz-e Footballi (2016–)
 Football 1 (2017–)
 Videocheck (2018–)
 Lezate Football (2018–)

See also
 Islamic Republic of Iran Broadcasting
 List of sports television channels

References

External links

IRIB Varzesh Live streaming

Islamic Republic of Iran Broadcasting
Television stations in Iran
Persian-language television stations
Television channels and stations established in 2012
Sports television networks